Sutton-on-Sea railway station was a station in Sutton-on-Sea, Lincolnshire. It opened on 4 October 1886 and was a temporary terminus of a branch line from Willoughby. Two years later the line was extended to Mablethorpe. It closed in 1970 and the track was removed a few years after closure. The site is now lost under housing and a road alignment.

References

Disused railway stations in Lincolnshire
Former Great Northern Railway stations
Railway stations in Great Britain opened in 1886
Railway stations in Great Britain closed in 1970
Beeching closures in England